Romanați County was a county (Romanian: județ) in the Kingdom of Romania, in southeastern part of the historical region of Oltenia. The county seat was Caracal. 

The county was located in the southwestern part of Romania, in the southeastern part of Oltenia. The county was bordered on the west by Dolj County, to the north by Vâlcea County, to the east by the counties of Olt and Teleorman, and to the south by the Kingdom of Bulgaria. Its territory now comprises the south-eastern part of the current Dolj County, the central-southern part of the current Olt County, and a small part in the southwestern part (around Islaz) of Teleorman County. The county was disbanded with the administrative reform of 6 September 1950.

A proposal to bring back the name Romanați to the modern-day Olt County for changing its name to "Olt-Romanați County" was first suggested in 2017, but a name referendum held on 6 and 7 October 2018 failed to get enough votes to validate it, and thus, the name change proposal was unsuccessful.

Administrative organization

Administratively, Romanaṭi County was divided into three districts (plăși):
 Plasa Dunărea
 Plasa Ocolu
 Plasa Oltu de Sus

Subsequently, two more districts were established:Plasa Câmpu
Plasa Oltețu

Population 
According to the 1930 census data, the county population was 271,096 inhabitants, ethnically divided as follows: 98.4% Romanians, 1.1% Romanies, as well as other minorities. From the religious point of view, the population was 99.6% Eastern Orthodox, 0.1% Roman Catholic, as well as other minorities.

Urban population 
In 1930, the county's urban population (the three communes of Caracal, Corabia, and Balș) was 29,308 inhabitants, comprising 94.2% Romanians, 2.9% Romanies, 0.5% Hungarians, 0.5% Jews, 0.4% Greeks, 0.3% Germans, as well as other minorities. From the religious point of view, the urban population was composed of 97.8% Eastern Orthodox, 0.8% Roman Catholic, 0.6% Jewish, 0.2% Greek Catholic, 0.2% Lutheran, 0.2% Calvinist, as well as other minorities.

References

External links

  Romanați County on memoria.ro

Former counties of Romania
Oltenia
1879 establishments in Romania
1938 disestablishments in Romania
1940 establishments in Romania
1950 disestablishments in Romania
States and territories established in 1879
States and territories disestablished in 1938
States and territories established in 1940
States and territories disestablished in 1950